Sarvant may refer to:

Sarvant Glacier
Adam Sarvant